Ceratosporella is a genus of fungi. Some species interact with species of trees in the families Betulaceae and Fagaceae (Carpinus betulus, Castanea sativa). Ceratosporella disticha can be isolated from decaying leaves of the palm Arenga westerhautii in Malaysia.

References

 Two new species of Ceratosporella (anamorphic fungi) from Brazilian Amazon forest. Luis Fernando Pascholati Gusmao and Josiane Monteiro, Nova Hedwigia, 98(3-4), page 481, February 2014,

External links
 
 Ceratosporella at Mycobank

Ascomycota genera
Ascomycota enigmatic taxa